Brooklyn Park may refer to:

 Brooklyn Park, Maryland, United States
 Brooklyn Park, Minnesota, United States
 Brooklyn Park, South Australia